Liviu Ion Antal (born 2 June 1989) is a Romanian professional footballer who plays as a winger for Liga I club CS Mioveni.

He was the top goalscorer of the 2013–14 Liga I, as he netted fifteen times for Vaslui which was relegated at the end of the season due to financial issues. After moving abroad and having brief spells in Turkey and Israel, he repeated the performance with Lithuanian side Žalgiris in 2018.

Club career

Oțelul Galați
He was a very important player for Oțelul Galați helping the team win their first title in the 2010–11 season. He then played in the 2011–12 UEFA Champions League season against Manchester United, S.L. Benfica and FC Basel.

Vaslui
On 14 June 2012, Antal signed a 4-year deal with FC Vaslui. He scored his first goal for FC Vaslui on 1 August 2012 in a 1–1 draw against Fenerbahçe in the UEFA Champions League third qualifying round.

Gençlerbirliği
In July 2014, Antal started his first experience abroad. After FC Vaslui declared bankruptcy, Antal became a free agent and signed a contract with the Turkish side Gençlerbirliği. He made his debut for the club coming on as a 67' substitute on 13 September 2014. He scored his first goal for the club on 25 October 2014 against Fenerbahçe.

Beitar Jerusalem
On 1 February 2015, Antal signed a 1-year deal with Beitar Jerusalem F.C.
Antal made his debut for the club that same week in an away game at Hapoel Haifa, scoring Beitar's second goal from a penalty as Beitar went on to win 4–3.

Žalgiris Vilnius
Antal signed for Vilnius-based club on 20 June 2017. He agreed to 1,5 years deal with Lithuanian champions.

International career

Antal made his debut for the Romania national team at the age of 22 in 2011 in a friendly game against Paraguay.

Career statistics

Club

Honours

Club
Oțelul Galați
Liga I: 2010–11
Supercupa României: 2011

Žalgiris
A Lyga: 2020
Lithuanian Cup: 2018
Lithuanian Supercup: 2020

Individual
Liga I top scorer: 2013–14 (16 goals)
DigiSport Liga I Player of the Month: October 2015
A Lyga top scorer: 2018 (23 goals)
A Lyga Team of the Year: 2018
 A Lyga Player of the Month: May 2018, August 2018

References

External links

1989 births
People from Șimleu Silvaniei
Living people
Romanian footballers
Romania under-21 international footballers
Romania international footballers
Association football midfielders
Liga I players
Liga II players
CS Concordia Chiajna players
ASC Oțelul Galați players
ASA 2013 Târgu Mureș players
FC Vaslui players
CS Pandurii Târgu Jiu players
CFR Cluj players
FC UTA Arad players
CS Mioveni players
Süper Lig players
Gençlerbirliği S.K. footballers
Israeli Premier League players
Beitar Jerusalem F.C. players
Hapoel Tel Aviv F.C. players
A Lyga players
FK Žalgiris players
Nemzeti Bajnokság I players
Zalaegerszegi TE players
Szombathelyi Haladás footballers
Romanian expatriate footballers
Expatriate footballers in Israel
Romanian expatriate sportspeople in Israel
Expatriate footballers in Lithuania
Romanian expatriate sportspeople in Lithuania
Expatriate footballers in Turkey
Romanian expatriate sportspeople in Turkey
Expatriate footballers in Hungary
Romanian expatriate sportspeople in Hungary